Livonian may refer to:

Livonians, the Livonian people
Livonian language, a Finnic language
Anything else pertaining to Livonia

See also 

Language and nationality disambiguation pages